
Gmina Dąbrowa Zielona is a rural gmina (administrative district) in Częstochowa County, Silesian Voivodeship, in southern Poland.

Villages
Gmina Dąbrowa Zielona contains the villages and settlements of Borowce, Cielętniki, Cudków, Dąbek, Dąbrowa Zielona, Lipie, Milionów, Niebyła, Nowa Wieś, Olbrachcice, Raczkowice, Raczkowice-Kolonia, Rogaczew, Soborzyce, Święta Anna and Ulesie.

Neighbouring gminas
Gmina Dąbrowa Zielona is bordered by the gminas of Gidle, Kłomnice, Koniecpol, Mstów, Przyrów and Żytno.

References

Dabrowa Zielona
Częstochowa County